SPADEX or Space Docking Experiment is a twin spacecraft mission being developed by Indian Space Research Organisation to mature technologies related to orbital rendezvous, docking, formation flying, with scope of applications in human spaceflight, in-space satellite servicing and other proximity operations.

SPADEX campaign would consist of two IMS class (200 kg) satellites, one would be Chaser and other being Target and both would be launched as co-passengers or auxiliary payloads. Both spacecraft would be injected into slightly different orbits.

Space Docking Experiment is currently scheduled for launch from Satish Dhawan Space Centre aboard a Polar Satellite launch Vehicle.

Objectives 

 Autonomous rendezvous and docking
 Controlling one spacecraft with Attitude Control System of other spacecraft while in docked configuration.
 Formation flying
 Remote robotic arm operations

Status  

With preliminary studies done in 2016, Space Docking Experiment was approved by Government of India with initial funding of ₹10 crore cleared in 2017. In June 2019, ISRO was looking for proposals to study remote robotic arm operation, rendezvous and docking related technologies on its PSLV fourth stage (PS4) orbital platform. 

, Space docking Experiment has been sanctioned  in funding and is aiming for launch in third quarter of 2024.

See also 

 ETS-VII or KIKU-7, also known as Orihime/Hikoboshi
 Kosmos 186 and Kosmos 188
 Orbital Express
 Robotic Refueling Mission

References 

Proposed spacecraft
2024 in spaceflight
Robotic satellite repair vehicles